The NSW Rail Museum is the main railway museum in New South Wales, Australia. A division of Transport Heritage NSW, it was previously known as the New South Wales Rail Transport Museum (NSWRTM), Rail Heritage Centre and Trainworks.

Transport Heritage NSW has divisions located in Thirlmere, New South Wales, where the NSW Rail Museum is dedicated to displaying locomotives, passenger cars, and freight rolling stock formerly operated by the New South Wales Government Railways (NSWGR) and various private operators.  The Blue Mountains division is located at the Valley Heights Locomotive Depot Heritage Museum.

 At Thirlmere, the NSW Rail Museum operates steam heritage trains on the Picton – Mittagong railway line between Picton, Thirlmere and Buxton.  It also hosts the Thirlmere Festival of Steam in March each year.
 In addition to this, Transport Heritage NSW regularly operates mainline tours under the NSW Rail Museum branding.  These can consist of day or extended tours, usually over a weekend.
 At Valley Heights, the co-located Valley Heights Steam Tramway runs an 1890s steam tram and trailer, and a Stephenson loco 0-6-0 CPC2 (built in 1899) with open ended carriage over track in the former roundhouse and associated access tracks.

History

The NSWRTM was established in October 1962 with 62 members. A survey of potential sites around Sydney found Enfield Locomotive Depot to be the most suitable and in 1963 a successful submission was made to the Department of Railways. Under the arrangement the department would retain ownership of the locomotives and rolling stock and responsibility for their maintenance. As Enfield depot was still active, exhibits were sent to Enfield for storage but not able to be accessed. In 1967, the department made an area adjacent to Petersham station available to the museum. The first locomotives outshopped were 3526 and 3609 painted blue and green respectively.

In July 1969, the NSWRTM was able to move into Enfield Roundhouse Number 3 with all exhibits transferred by September. In 1970, the museum was able to relocate into the larger Roundhouse Number 1, allowing the majority of the collection to be stored undercover. In October 1972, the display at Enfield was officially opened by Commissioner for Railways, Neil McCusker.

The NSWRTM had always maintained a good relationship with the Department of Railways, but in October 1972 it was replaced by the Public Transport Commission. The PTC under Commissioner Philip Shirley decided it wanted all steam locomotives, including those owned by preservation organisations, off the network with 3820 operating the NSWRTM's last tour to Taree in 1974. The PTC also decided it wanted nothing to do with maintaining the NSWRTM's collection and handed over the exhibits to the museum under a Deed of Gift.

The PTC also wanted to demolish the Enfield roundhouses to make way for a container terminal and offered the museum a site at Thirlmere on the then lightly used Picton – Mittagong loop line. Site clearing began in late 1974 and works were sufficiently advanced for the transfer of stock to begin in June 1975.  While some trains were hauled by diesel locomotives, most were worked by the museum's own steam locomotives.

The NSWRTM opened at its current location in on 1 June 1976.  Services on the loop line between Thirlmere and Buxton began on 13 June 1976.  Initially uncovered, the first section of roofing was completed in 1979.  It was over a decade before the whole site was covered.

The PTC relaxed its ban on main line steam in October 1976. 3801 returned to the main line.  By the early 1980s it was operating enthusiast journeys on a regular basis including a monthly service from Sydney Central to Thirlmere.

In 1984, the NSWRTM became a founding member of the 3801 Limited managerial board that was created to oversee the operation of the locomotive 3801.  The famous British railway locomotive 4472 Flying Scotsman visited Thirlmere in March 1989 as part of its tour around Australia.

In 1993, the museum concluded a lease for the  Picton – Buxton railway line following its closure by the State Rail Authority.

The NSWRTM was removed as a board member of 3801 Limited in November 2006 after the 20-year lease of 3801 was not renewed.  The locomotive was returned to the NSWRTM.

Redevelopment
In 2006, the Government of New South Wales endorsed the Sustainable Rail Heritage Asset Management Strategy to ensure the collection of the State's rail heritage assets are maintained and conserved by dedicated volunteers and shared with the public for current and future generations to appreciate and enjoy. In 2007, RailCorp’s Office of Rail Heritage commissioned the development of a concept design for the NSWRTM’s upgrade. This saw ownership in the NSWRTM vested in Trainworks Limited, a 100% subsidiary of RailCorp.

A major redevelopment saw the locomotive depot relocated to a roundhouse built at the southern end of the site opening in November 2009.  To create room for stage two of the development of the museum, some of the exhibits were moved to Broadmeadow and Goulburn in 2009. Work on stage two began in December 2009, which included demolition of the existing locomotive maintenance building, construction of a new major exhibits building and other works. The New South Wales Rail Transport Museum re-opened in April 2011.

Organisation
The museum has over 2,300 members, including an active volunteer workforce of over 400 and a small number of full-time staff. It is administered by a voluntary Board and a Management Committee. The museum is accredited as a rail operator under the NSW Rail Safety Act 2002 meaning it has network access rights on the NSW main line rail network. It also has accreditation to operate in Victoria.

Amalgamation
In May 2013, the Minister for Transport announced Transport Heritage NSW, a new not-for-profit company, would be established to manage rail heritage in NSW following an independent review of rail heritage commissioned by the NSW Government. THNSW have responsibility for the rebranded NSW Rail Museum and the Valley Heights site.

All assets were transferred to THNSW after the merge.

Museum exhibits
The museum has an extensive collection of railway locomotives, carriages, wagons and other railway equipment from both the NSWGR and privately operated railways displayed at Thirlmere:

Other Locomotives
 40 class diesel locomotive 4001
 42 class diesel locomotive 4201
 43 class diesel locomotive 4306
 44 class diesel locomotives 4490
 442 class diesel locomotive 44211
 45 class diesel locomotive 4501 and 4520
 48 class diesel locomotive 4803, 4807 and 4833
 49 class diesel locomotive 4916
 86 class electric locomotive 8646
 BHP D1 class D1
 CPH railmotor CPH 18

Carriages 

 The Governor-General's state carriage. A wooden carriage built for the Governor-General of Australia and royal guests at the Eveleigh Carriage Workshops in 1901 ahead of the opening of the first parliament of Australia when it was used by the Duke and Duchess of Cornwall and York. In 1920 it carried the Prince of Wales whilst he was visiting Sydney aboard the HMS Renown and in 1927 it carried the Duke and Duchess of York whilst they were visiting to open the first session of the Australian Parliament in Canberra. The carriage was also used by Queen Elizabeth II and Prince Philip during the 1954 royal visit. In 1964 the carriage was used for the visit of Princess Marina. The carriage was initially put on display at the Powerhouse Museum in 1993 before being transferred to the NSW Rail Museum where it was restored and put on display.
 The State Governor's Car, built in 1911
 A van used by Arnott's biscuit company to transport biscuits

Other items 
 A collection of over 18,000 train tickets and passes

Publications
 Roundhouse (periodical)

See also

 List of transport museums
 Rail transport in New South Wales

References

External links

 NSW Rail Museum website
 Transport Heritage NSW website
 Valley Heights Locomotive Depot Heritage Museum
 NSW Preserved Steam Locomotives

Railway museums in New South Wales
1962 establishments in Australia
Thirlmere, New South Wales
Steam museums in Australia
Transport museums in Australia